William Brandenburg may refer to:

 Will Brandenburg (born 1987), American alpine ski racer
 William H. Brandenburg, U.S. Army general